William Bevan may refer to:
 Bill Bevan (1913–1975), American football player and coach
 Billy Bevan (1887–1957), Australian film actor
 William Bevan (abolitionist) ca.1800 -c.1860 Congregationalist minister in Liverpool and leading abolitionist
 William Emmanuel Bevan, British electronic musician known as Burial
 William Bevan (sloopmaster) (fl. 1723–1737), Hudson's Bay Company explorer
 William Bevan (psychologist) (1922–2007), former president of the American Psychological Association
 William Bevan (priest) (1821–1908), Welsh clergyman
 SS William Bevan, see List of Liberty ships (S–Z)